Cariaso is a surname. Notable people with the surname include:

 Chris Cariaso (born 1981), Filipino-American mixed martial artist
 Jeffrey Cariaso (born 1972), Filipino-American basketball player and coach

Tagalog-language surnames